Carleton is a given name.

Those bearing it include:

 Carleton Watkins (1829–1916), American photographer
 Carleton Clement (1896–1917), Canadian fighter pilot
 Carleton Bartlett Gibson (1863–1927) 
 Carleton Coon (musician) (1898–1932), American musician of Coon-Sanders Original Nighthawk Orchestra 
 Carleton Wiggins (1848–1932), American painter
 Carleton Tufnell (1856–1940), English cricketer 
 Carleton Ellis (1876–1941), American chemist
 Carleton Winslow (1876–1946), American architect
 (Ernest) Carleton Bass (born 1876), Irish-born bullfighter in U.S.
 Carleton Rea (1861–1946), English botanist
 Carleton Lewis Brownson (1866–1948), American classical-languages scholar and academic administrator 
 George Carleton Lacy (1888–1951), American missionary in China
 Carleton O'Brien (1903–1952), American racketeer
 Carleton Roy Ball (1873–1958), American botanist
 Carleton Bruns Joeckel (1886–1960), American librarian and scholar
 Carleton F. Burke (died  1962), American horse breeder and racer, namesake of Carleton F. Burke Handicap
 Carleton Raymond Mabley (1878–1963), American automotive entrepreneur 
  Carleton Kemp Allen (1887–1966), Australian-born British academic
 Carleton Washburne (1889–1968), American educator
 Carleton Kendrake, pseudonym of Erle Stanley Gardner (1889–1970), American lawyer and novelist
 Carleton H. Wright (1892–1970), American naval officer
 Carleton Garretson Young (1907–1971), American actor
 Carleton J. King (1904–1977), American politician
 Carleton Lamont MacMillan (1903–1978), Canadian physician and politician
 Carleton Beals (1893–1979), American journalist
 Carleton Harris (1909–1980), Justice of the Arkansas Supreme Court
 Carleton S. Coon (1904–1981), American anthropologist 
 Robert Carleton Smith (1908–1984), American arts administrator 
 Carleton G. Howe (1898–1993), American orchardist and politician
 Carleton Young (1905–1994), American actor
 Carleton Putnam (1901–1998), American entrepreneur
 Carleton Weir Elliott (1928–2003), Canadian musician
 Daniel Carleton Gajdusek (1923–2008), American medical researcher
 Carleton Naiche-Palmer (1947–2010), American native-tribe politician 
 Carleton Opgaard (1929–2014), American academic administrator 
 Carleton Mabee (1914–2014), American writer 
 Carleton Upham Carpenter, Jr. (1926–2022), American performer
 Carleton Perry (born 1931), American politician
 Carleton "Carty" S. Finkbeiner (born 1939), American politician
 Carleton H. Sheets (born 1939), American real-estate entrepreneur
 Carleton D. Powell (born 1939), American jurist
 Carleton Oats (born 1942), American football player 
 Cara Carleton "Carly" Fiorina (born 1954), American business executive and political candidate
 Carleton Leonard (born 1958), English footballer 
 Carleton Scott (born 1988), American basketball player
 Carleton Olegario Máximo, nominal author of thousands of works reprinted from Wikipedia content
 Carleton E. Carey Sr. (fl. c. 2010), American politician

See also

 Carlston (name)